Aconcagua is a genus of moths in the family Geometridae first described by Rindge in 1983.

Species
Aconcagua aculeata Rindge, 1975
Aconcagua crebra Rindge, 1975
Aconcagua fessa Rindge, 1975

References

Nacophorini
Geometridae genera